Laurie Rose  (born 20 December) is an English cinematographer based in Brighton. He has collaborated with director Ben Wheatley on films such as Down Terrace, High-Rise, Free Fire and the 2020 adaptation of Daphne du Maurier's Rebecca. In 2014, Complex included him on the "Underrated Cinematographers Poised to Make It Big in 2015" list. In 2016, Variety included him on the "10 Cinematographers to Watch" list. In that year, he became a member of the British Society of Cinematographers. At the 2016 British Academy Television Craft Awards, he won the Photography & Lighting: Fiction award for his work on London Spy.

Filmography
Film

Television

Awards
 2016 - British Academy Television Craft Awards - Photography & Lighting: Fiction (London Spy)
 2018 - Toronto After Dark Film Festival - Best Cinematography (Overlord) - shared with Fabian Wagner.

References

External links
 

Living people
English cinematographers
Year of birth missing (living people)